Chrysolaminarin is a linear polymer of β(1→3) and β(1→6) linked glucose units in a ratio of 11:1. It used to be known as leucosin.

Function
Chrysolaminarin is a storage polysaccharide typically found in photosynthetic heterokonts. It is used as a carbohydrate food reserve by phytoplankton such as Bacillariophyta (similar to the use of laminarin by brown algae).

Chrysolaminarin is stored inside the cells of these organisms dissolved in water and encapsuled in vacuoles whose refractive index increases with chrysolaminarin content. In addition, heterokont algae use oil as a storage compound. Besides energy reserve, oil helps the algae to control their buoyancy.

References

Polysaccharides